Air Wales served the following destinations (during its operations):

Europe
Belgium
Brussels – Brussels Airport
France
Paris – Charles de Gaulle Airport
Ireland
Cork – Cork Airport Focus City
Dublin – Dublin Airport
Jersey
Jersey – Jersey Airport
Netherlands
Amsterdam – Amsterdam Schiphol Airport
United Kingdom
Exeter – Exeter International Airport
Liverpool – Liverpool Airport
London
London City Airport
London Gatwick Airport
Manchester – Manchester Airport
Newcastle upon Tyne – Newcastle Airport
Norwich – Norwich International Airport
Plymouth – Plymouth Airport Focus City
Northern Ireland
Belfast – Belfast City Airport
Scotland
Aberdeen – Aberdeen Airport
Glasgow – Glasgow Prestwick Airport
Wales
Cardiff – Cardiff International Airport Base
Swansea – Swansea Airport Focus City

References

Air Wales